Yegizaw Michael is a prominent artist in Eritrea. He has exhibited his art in Eritrea, Kenya, Uganda, United States and Austria and has won numerous prizes and Awards. In 1995 he was the Best Artist of the Year in Kenya. He is also a two-time winner of Eritrea's Raimok National Art Award for 1996 and 1997. In 1997 Yegizaw was the initiator, organizer and artist director of the historic Artists Against AIDS national awareness campaign in Eritrea. Artists Against AIDS involved over 30 Eritrean artists, musicians, poets who collaborated in a nationwide campaign to educate and sensitize people about the scourge of AIDS. After he moved to the US (where he now resides) he has produced several mosaics like the Seattle Children Art Museum and others.

References

External links
Official site

Year of birth missing (living people)
Living people
Eritrean artists